The following television stations broadcast on digital channel 2 in the United States:

The following television stations, which are no longer licensed, formerly broadcast on digital channel 2 in the United States:

References

02 digital